WUPE-FM (100.1 MHz) is a classic hits radio station owned by Townsquare Media. Licensed to North Adams, Massachusetts, United States, WUPE-FM serves Pittsfield.

History
The station went on the air July 12, 1964, as WMNB-FM, owned by the Hardman family along with WMNB (1230 AM) and the North Adams Transcript.  The Hardmans sold Northern Berkshire Broadcasting to Donald A. Thurston in 1966; the company became Berkshire Broadcasting after the purchase of WSBS in Great Barrington in 1968.  By 1973, WMNB-FM had a beautiful music format, separately-programmed from the AM station (though even at WMNB-FM's inception the two stations did not duplicate more than thirty percent of their programming).  The callsign was modified to simply WMNB on January 30, 1988, after the AM station was renamed WNAW.  During the mid-1990s, WMNB's format incorporated smooth jazz and soft adult contemporary programming; as a whole, however, it remained one of the few remaining beautiful music stations.

Vox Communications purchased Berkshire Broadcasting in November 2003, with the sale closing in May 2004.  The next month, WMNB began simulcasting an oldies genre with another Vox station, WUPE (95.9).  The station took the WUPE-FM callsign two years later, as part of a larger shuffle resulting in WBEC-FM moving from 105.5 (now WWEI) to 95.9.  WUPE-FM's programming also began to be heard on an AM station in Pittsfield on 1110 AM. Vox transferred most of its stations to Gamma Broadcasting in late 2012. In August 2013, Gamma reached a deal to sell its Berkshire County radio stations, including WUPE-FM, to Reed Miami Holdings; the sale was canceled on December 30, 2013.

WUPE-FM's tower, along with an adjacent cell tower, collapsed on March 29, 2014, as a result of high winds, forcing the station off the air. The station stated that it would resume broadcasting with a temporary antenna by April 1. WUPE's simulcast on 1110 AM in Pittsfield and its web stream were not affected by the tower collapse.

In October 2016, Gamma Broadcasting agreed to sell its stations to Galaxy Communications; the sale fell through, and in 2017 the stations were acquired by Townsquare Media.

See also
 WUPE (AM)

References

External links

UPE-FM
Radio stations established in 1964
1964 establishments in Massachusetts
Classic hits radio stations in the United States
North Adams, Massachusetts
Mass media in Berkshire County, Massachusetts
Townsquare Media radio stations